The 1946 Atlantic hurricane season resulted in no fatalities in the United States. The season officially began on June 15, 1946, and lasted until November 15, 1946. These dates conventionally delimit the period of each year when most tropical cyclones form in the Atlantic basin. However, the first storm, developed in the Gulf of Mexico on June 13, while the final system dissipated just offshore Florida on November 3. There were seven tropical storm; three of them attained hurricane status, while none intensified into major hurricanes, which are Category 3 or higher on the modern-day Saffir–Simpson hurricane wind scale. This had not occurred since 1940 and would not again until 1968. Operationally, the fifth tropical storm, which existed near the Azores in early October, was not considered a tropical cyclone, but was added to HURDAT in 2014.

Although every tropical storm impacted land, effects overall were light, with less than $10 million (1946 USD) in damage and no deaths in the United States throughout the season. The season's most intense cyclone was the fourth hurricane. While the storm was moving northeastward offshore the East Coast of the United States, the Norwegian tanker Maril II was destroyed at sea, causing 16 drownings; the incident could not be directly attributed to the hurricane. The second storm brought relatively minor damage to the Cape Fear region of North Carolina after striking the state early in its duration. While an extratropical cyclone, the remnants of the fifth cyclone devastated a few islands of the Azores and left 120 fishermen missing. The Florida hurricane severely damaged sugar cane in western Cuba and caused five deaths in the island nation. Additionally, the storm left $5.2 million in damage in Florida, mostly inflicting citrus crops. The final storm caused several millions of dollars in damage to crops near Lake Okeechobee.



Season summary 

The Atlantic hurricane season officially began on June 16, 1946. However, tropical cyclogenesis began on June 13, three days before the official start of the season. There was a total of seven tropical storms, slightly below the contemporaneous 20-year average of 8.5 per season. Three of those strengthened into hurricanes, while none reached major hurricane status – Category 3 or higher on the modern-day Saffir–Simpson hurricane wind scale – for the first time since 1940 and it was a phenomenon that would not occur again until 1968. One hurricane made landfall in the United States, while the two other storms with winds of at least  remained at sea during their strongest intensities. Overall in the United States, the season resulted in less than $10 million in damage and no deaths. Collectively, the storms of the season left at least $5.2 million in damage. The final cyclone of the season dissipated on November 3, 12 days before the official end of the season on November 15, 1946.

Tropical cyclogenesis began with the development of a tropical storm over the Gulf of Mexico on June 13. The next system formed offshore the Southeastern United States on July 5. Activity then ceased for nearly seven weeks, until August 25, when the third storm originated in the Bay of Campeche. Although September is the climatological peak of hurricane season, there was only one tropical cyclone that strengthened to tropical storm status that month. Additionally, a tropical depression briefly existed near Central America. October was the most active month of the season, with three tropical cyclones. The third storm in October, which was the last system of the season, lasted until November 3.

The season's activity was reflected with an accumulated cyclone energy (ACE) rating of 20, the lowest total since 1925 and until 1983. ACE is, broadly speaking, a measure of the power of the hurricane multiplied by the length of time it existed, so storms that last a long time, as well as particularly strong hurricanes, have high ACEs. It is only calculated for full advisories on tropical systems at or exceeding , which is tropical storm strength.

Systems

Tropical Storm One 

Moving slowly northwestward, the depression intensified into a tropical storm early on the next day. Later that day, the cyclone weakened to a tropical depression offshore Louisiana. The storm made landfall just east of the Louisiana–Texas border on June 16 and rapidly dissipated. It may have remained a tropical depression throughout its lifespan but data was inconclusive.

Hurricane Two 

The interaction between a frontal boundary and a tropical wave resulted in the development of an extratropical cyclone on July 5 offshore the Southeastern United States. Throughout the day, the storm acquired tropical characteristics. In the Wilmington area, winds damaged plate-glass windows and caused brief disruptions to electricity and communication services. Further inland, heavy rainfall, including  in less than 24 hours in Manteo, resulted in considerable loss to crops, with 15%-20% damaged in some areas. That was the heaviest 24-hour precipitation total recorded in Manteo since observations began in 1905.

The storm moved northeastward and reemerged into the Atlantic Ocean near the southern end of Bodie Island early on July 7. Shortly thereafter, the cyclone began strengthening and became a Category 1 hurricane by 12:00 UTC. It then curved eastward and began losing tropical characteristics. The extratropical remnants gradually curved northeastward and then north-northeastward while slowly weakening. Late on July 10, the extratropical storm dissipated near Cape Race, Newfoundland.

Tropical Storm Three 

In late August, a disturbance was monitored moving over the western Caribbean Sea near Great Swan Island. Despite favorable conditions, further development did not occur until after it reached the Bay of Campeche. Early on August 25, it is estimated that a tropical storm developed after a reconnaissance aircraft flight reported that the system acquired a well-defined circulation. By early the next day, the cyclone weakened to a tropical depression and dissipated.

Tropical depression 
However, by the following day, historical weather maps no longer indicated a tropical depression. It is uncertain whether the system dissipated or made landfall in Central America.

Hurricane Four 

The hurricane intensified further after entering the open Atlantic, becoming on September 13. The storm accelerated and weakened due to cooler sea surface temperatures, falling to tropical storm status early on September 15. The extratropical remnants moved across Newfoundland and the northern Atlantic, until dissipating well north of the Azores on September 17.

The Norwegian tanker Maril II sank after splitting in two, drowning sixteen people. Some areas of Nova Scotia experienced strong winds, with sustained winds up to  observed throughout the province and a gust of  recorded at Sable Island. Heavy rain was also reported, with  measured in Halifax. High seas during the Royal Nova Scotia Yacht Squadron race "The Hood Cup" forced the yachts to return to port. When the radar image was taken, it was only the third time in history that a hurricane passed close enough to a radar site to reveal its structure.

Tropical Storm Five 

After six hours, the depression intensified into a tropical storm. It intensified further while moving east-northeastward. This storm was not included in HURDAT until 2014.

Although the system became extratropical, it continued to deepen further, with sustained winds reaching  late on October 4. Around that time, the storm passed through the Azores near Faial Island, before weakening and dissipating north of the island chain on October 6. Rough seas at Santa Maria Island left 120 fishermen missing, while 12 fishing vessels, 2 tugboats, and several launches were destroyed. Four fishing boats were also missing. Strong wind gusts up to  caused "catastrophic" damage on Santa Maria and São Miguel islands. Homes, crops, and pineapple greenhouses were demolished, while communications were knocked out. Additionally, Lajes Field on Terceira Island was "practically destroyed".

Hurricane Six 

A disturbance from the Intertropical Convergence Zone developed into a tropical storm late on October 5, while located over the western Caribbean Sea near the Belize–Mexico border. It moved northeastward and strengthened, reaching Category 1 hurricane status the next day. Several sugar cane fields were flattened, with millions of tons of the crop destroyed. In many towns, telephone and telegraphic communications were cut off. Five deaths occurred in Cuba.

After becoming a Category 2 hurricane on October 7, the cyclone weakened to a Category 1 just six hours later. In Florida, the gusty winds and rainfall produced by the storm inflicted damage mostly on crops. About 2% of the state's total citrus crop was lost, with damage totaling $5 million. Only about $200,000 in property damage occurred, which was mostly due to coastal flooding in cities such as Everglades, Fort Myers, and Punta Gorda. Moving inland, the hurricane weakened to a tropical storm later on October 8. Early on October 9, the system became extratropical over South Carolina. However, the extratropical remnants persisted for several days, moving in a semicircular path over the eastern Atlantic until dissipating well north of Hispaniola on October 14.

Tropical Storm Seven 

A tropical wave developed into a tropical depression late on October 31 over the Bahamas about halfway between Acklins and Little Inagua. The depression strengthened into a tropical storm early on November 1 and moved northwestward, striking several islands, including Acklins, Long Island, Exuma, and Andros. The system then made landfall near Lake Worth, Florida, at the same intensity around 22:00 UTC. Early on November 2, the storm weakened to a tropical depression and recurved northeastward over Central Florida.

Due to the weak nature of the storm, no wind damage occurred. However, flooding occurred around Lake Okeechobee due to rainfall reaching . Along main highways, several cars stalled, while a number of canals overflowed. Between 50%-70% of early fall crops in the area were damaged, with as much as 60% of snap bean crops lost. Damage was in the several millions range.

Season effects

See also 

 List of tropical cyclones
 Atlantic hurricane season
 1900–1950 South-West Indian Ocean cyclone seasons
 1940s Australian region cyclone seasons
 1940s South Pacific cyclone seasons

References

External links 

1946
1946 meteorology
1946 natural disasters